Ahmad Tarmizi bin Sulaiman is a Malaysian politician who has served as the Member of Parliament (MP) for Sik since May 2018.  He was the Deputy President of Majlis Perundingan Pertubuhan Islam Malaysia (MAPIM). He is a member of the Malaysian Islamic Party (PAS), a component party od the ruling Perikatan Nasional (PN) coalition.

Participation in NGO 
 He was the Deputy President of MAPIM and joined its mission to spread humanitarianism to other Islamic countries.

Election results

References 

Year of birth missing (living people)
Living people
Place of birth missing (living people)
Malaysian Islamic Party politicians
Members of the Dewan Rakyat